Matthew W. "Matt" McCoy (born March 29, 1966) is a member of the Board of Supervisors of Polk County, Iowa, representing the fifth district. A member of the Iowa Democratic Party, McCoy served in the Iowa Senate from 1997-2019 and the Iowa House of Representatives from 1993-1997.  McCoy was the first openly gay member of the Iowa General Assembly.

Biography
McCoy graduated from Dowling Catholic High School, in West Des Moines, Iowa, and received his B.A. from Briar Cliff College in political science.  In 2016, McCoy completed Harvard University's John F. Kennedy School of Government program for Senior Executives in State and Local Government as a David Bohnett LGBTQ Victory Institute Leadership Fellow.

Iowa House and Senate
McCoy was elected to the Iowa House of Representatives in 1992 from the 67th district.  In 1996, he was elected to the Iowa Senate from the 34th District.  While in the Iowa Senate, McCoy served on several committees, including commerce, local government, transportation, and appropriations.

McCoy was re-elected in 2006 with 13,276 votes (66%), defeating Republican opponent Nicholas G. van Patten, and again in 2010.

On January 31, 2018, McCoy announced he would not seek reelection to the Iowa State Senate and instead would run for Polk County Supervisor from District Five, a seat held by Democrat John Mauro for the previous 16 years. McCoy defeated Mauro in the Democratic primary in June 2018 and won the general election in November 2018.

Personal life
McCoy has one son, Jack, and worships at Plymouth Congregational Church.

References

Democratic Party Iowa state senators
Democratic Party members of the Iowa House of Representatives
1966 births
Living people
LGBT Protestants
LGBT state legislators in Iowa
Gay politicians
Politicians from Des Moines, Iowa
Briar Cliff University alumni
21st-century American politicians